Curepipe Starlight Sports Club is a Mauritian football club based in Curepipe. They play in the Mauritian League, the top division in Mauritian football.

They won the league for the first time in 2007 and thus qualified for the CAF Champions League 2008. They then became part of history, when they played at the Stade Said Mohamed Cheikh in Moroni, where an African club competition match was hosted in the Comoros Islands for the first time. In 2008, they won the Mauritian League, the Mauritian Cup and as well as the Mauritian Republic Cup.

Ground
Their home stadium is Stade George V (cap. 6,200), located in Curepipe, Plaines Wilhems District. They share this stadium with the other club of Curepipe : Cercle De Joachim.

Achievements
Mauritian League: 4
2006–07, 2007–08, 2008–09 , 2012–13

Mauritian Cup: 3
2006, 2008, 2013

Mauritian Republic Cup: 2
2007, 2008

Performance in CAF competitions
CAF Champions League: 2 appearances
2008 – First Round
2009 – Preliminary Round

CAF Confederation Cup: 1 appearance
2007 – Preliminary Round

Current squad
As of September 1, 2017

External links
zerozerofootball Profile

References

Curepipe
Football clubs in Mauritius
2001 establishments in Mauritius